Relish is the debut studio album by American singer-songwriter Joan Osborne, released on March 21, 1995. It was nominated for Album of the Year at the 38th Grammy Awards, and also earned nominations for Best New Artist and Best Female Pop Vocal Performance for Osborne. In addition, the track "One of Us" was nominated for Record of the Year and Song of the Year.

Background
Relish contains songs performed in a mixture of styles: contemporary folk, rock, and pop.

Its biggest hit single, "One of Us", was used as the theme to the 2003–2005 television series Joan of Arcadia, although the show used a re-recorded version. The album and the song were both nominated for multiple Grammy Awards in 1996. The song was written by Eric Bazilian of the Hooters.

"Man in the Long Black Coat" is a cover of the Bob Dylan song from his 1989 album Oh Mercy.

The music for "Right Hand Man" is said to have been inspired by Captain Beefheart's 1982 song "Clear Spot," although the two are in different time signatures and have completely different lyrics and subject matter.

The final track, "Lumina", was used on the first episode of the HBO hit show The Sopranos. It was also used in an episode in the fourth season of the CBS hit show The Good Wife in 2013.

Track listing

Notes 
"One of Us" contains an introduction of "The Airplane Ride," a spiritual written by J. S. McConnel and sung by Nell Hampton, under license from Alan Lomax. Used by permission.
"Ladder" contains a sample from "Mambo Sun," written by Marc Bolan under license from Straight Ahead Productions Ltd. TRO/Essex Music International (ASCAP) as recorded by T. Rex. Used by permission.

Personnel
Credits adapted from CD liner notes.
Joan Osborne – vocals (all tracks), percussion (3, 5), acoustic guitar (11)
Eric Bazilian – guitar (1, 3-7, 9, 12), electric guitar (11), mandolin (1), chant (1), saxophone (3), harmonica (4, 5), electric piano (6), backing vocals (6)
Mark Egan – bass guitar (1, 3-7, 9-11)
Rob Hyman – piano (3, 7), organ (1, 4, 5, 7), synthesizer (1, 12), electric piano (4, 5, 11), percussion (5), Mellotron (6), backing vocals (6), drums (6)
Andy Kravitz – drums (1, 3-5, 7, 10, 11), percussion (3)

Additional personnel
Rick Di Fonzo – acoustic guitar (2), solo guitar (2, 8)
Sammy Merendino – drums (2, 9), rhythm collage (7, 8)
Chris Palmaro – electric piano (2, 8), organ (7), virtual fiddle (8), Mellotron (8, 9)
William Wittman – electric guitar (2), guitar (7)
Rick Chertoff – percussion (3, 5)
Leo Osborne – backing vocals (4)
Lee Campbell – fiddle (8)
Omar Hakim – drums (8)
Gary Lucas – guitar (8, 10)
Wade Schurman – harmonica (8, 10)
Catherine Russell – backing vocals (8)

Production
Produced by Rick Chertoff
Tracks 1–11 recorded and mixed by William Wittman; track 12 recorded and mixed by Rob Hyman
Assistant recording engineer at Big Blue: Mark Mason
Additional recording and mix engineering at PIE Studios by Rob Polhemus
Mastered by George Marino at Sterling Sound (NYC)

Charts

Weekly charts

Year-end charts

Certifications and sales

References

Joan Osborne albums
1995 albums
Albums produced by Rick Chertoff
Mercury Records albums
Polydor Records albums